Redpath is a surname of Scottish origin. Notable people with the surname include:

Alan Redpath (1907–1989), British evangelist, pastor and author
Anne Redpath (1895–1965), British artist
Beatrice Redpath (1886-1937), Canadian poet, short story writer
Bryan Redpath (born 1971), rugby player
Christine Redpath, ballet mistress and former soloist with New York City Ballet 
Ian Redpath (born 1941), cricketer
Jean Redpath (1937-2014), singer
John Redpath (1796–1869), Canadian businessman
Jim Redpath, mining engineer
James Redpath (1833-1891), American journalist and antislavery activist
Olive Redpath, American Victorian actress
Peter Redpath (1821-1894), Canadian businessman
Ronald Francis Redpath (1888-1970), Canadian wing commander

References